Chernevo is a rural locality (a village) and the administrative center of Orlovskoye Rural Settlement, Velikoustyugsky District, Vologda Oblast, Russia. The population was 318 as of 2002.

Geography 
Chernevo is located 66 km southeast of Veliky Ustyug (the district's administrative centre) by road. Podborye is the nearest rural locality.

References 

Rural localities in Velikoustyugsky District